NGC 7030 is a barred spiral galaxy located about 380 million light-years away in the constellation Capricornus. NGC 7030 has an estimated diameter of 133,510 light-years. NGC 7030 was discovered by astronomer Francis Preserved Leavenworth on September 3, 1885.

See also 
 NGC 487
 NGC 53
 List of NGC objects (7001–7840)

References

External links 
 

Barred spiral galaxies
Capricornus (constellation)
7030
66283
Astronomical objects discovered in 1885